Walter Manuel Benítez Rosales (born 4 June 1972) is a Cuban football manager.

Managerial career
Born in Granma Province, he had two spells in charge of the provincial side.

He was appointed to the national team position in November 2012. In December 2012, he won the 2012 Caribbean Cup title with Cuba.

Honours 
Caribbean Cup (1): 2012

References 

1972 births
Living people
People from Jiguaní
Cuban football managers
Cuba national football team managers